"Daydream Believer" is a song composed by American songwriter John Stewart shortly before he left the Kingston Trio. It was originally recorded by the Monkees, with Davy Jones singing the lead. The single reached No. 1 on the U.S. Billboard Hot 100 chart in December 1967, remaining there for four weeks, and peaked at No. 5 on the UK Singles Chart. It was the Monkees' third and last No. 1 hit in the U.S.

In 1979, "Daydream Believer" was recorded by Canadian singer Anne Murray, whose version reached No. 3 on the U.S. country singles chart and No. 12 on the Billboard Hot 100. The song has been recorded by others, including a 1971 version by Stewart.

The song title was featured in the name of the 2000 biopic about the band, Daydream Believers: The Monkees' Story.

The 2022 American drama Women Talking features this song.

Background

John Stewart wrote "Daydream Believer" as the third in a trilogy of songs about suburban life, recalling: "I remember going to bed thinking, 'What a wasted day — all I’ve done is daydream.' And from there I wrote the whole song. I never thought it was one of my best songs. Not at all".

The song was turned down by We Five and Spanky and Our Gang. While attending a party at Hoyt Axton's home in Hollywood's Laurel Canyon, producer Chip Douglas told Stewart that he was now producing the Monkees and asked if Stewart had any songs that might work for the group. Stewart offered "Daydream Believer." The song was recorded during the sessions for the Monkees' 1967 album Pisces, Aquarius, Capricorn & Jones Ltd., but was ultimately included on their 1968 album The Birds, The Bees & the Monkees. All four Monkees appear on the track; in addition to the lead vocals by Jones, Michael Nesmith plays lead guitar, Peter Tork plays piano and Micky Dolenz sings backing vocals. Tork created the piano introduction, and the orchestral arrangement was created by jazz trumpeter and composer Shorty Rogers, who included the same seven-note phrase preceding the chorus that can be heard on the Beach Boys' "Help Me, Rhonda."

Jones claimed he had been "pissed off" recording the song, with his lead vocal showing a hint of annoyance at the ongoing takes.

According to Billboard Hot 100 chart historian Joel Whitburn's mid-1980s book The Billboard Book of Number One Hits, the recording was originally scheduled to be the B-side of the Barry Mann/Cynthia Weil song "Love Is Only Sleeping" (from Pisces, Aquarius, Capricorn & Jones Ltd.), featuring lead vocals by Michael Nesmith. However, a week before release, it was discovered that the European single masters for "Love Is Only Sleeping" were not ready, but the masters for "Daydream Believer" were. A last-minute switch meant that "Daydream Believer" now became the A-side and "Goin' Down," a song written by all four Monkees with Diane Hildebrand in the style of Mose Allison, became the flip side. Nesmith would not be given a lead vocal on a Monkees single A-side until 1969's "Listen to the Band." Allegedly, Colgems Records did not like Nesmith's voice, preferring the voices of both Dolenz and Jones, and was further aggrieved when Nesmith insisted on the inclusion of at least two of his songs per album. Previously, Nesmith's lead vocal version of "The Girl I Knew Somewhere" was replaced with Dolenz on lead vocals for the B-side of the single "A Little Bit Me, a Little Bit You".

Billboard described the single as a "well written easy beat rhythm ballad" with a "clever opening."  Cash Box said that it has "fascinating arrangements that develop from a simple piano opening to a compelling ork ensemble and the hypnotic repetition of a very catchy refrain." According to Variety, the song's lyrics focus on the endgame of a comfy but increasingly distant relationship, with the narrator "caught in mid-gaze before the bathroom mirror, reflecting on the quiet dissolution of his materialistic marriage – a union between 'a daydream believer and a homecoming queen,' now curdled, driven more by money than by romance."

RCA Records did not like the song as written by Stewart, and insisted on changing a critical word. Stewart originally wrote: "Now you know how funky I can be," but RCA wanted to change it to "Now you know how happy I can be," as one meaning of "funky" is "smelly." Stewart initially objected because the change would completely reverse the meaning of the line and would not make sense in the context of the song. He relented because RCA was adamant and Stewart realized that the song could be a hit. In 2006, Stewart said that the proceeds from "Daydream Believer" "...kept me alive for all these years."

In 1986, three of the four Monkees (Dolenz, Jones and Tork) mounted a successful reunion tour and had a major hit with the newly recorded "That Was Then, This Is Now." Arista Records, which owned the Monkees' masters at the time, rereleased "Daydream Believer" as a followup single, remixed with a new and heavier percussion track by Michael Lloyd, who had produced "That Was Then, This Is Now."

Personnel
The Monkees
 Davy Jones — lead and backing vocals
 Micky Dolenz — harmony vocals
 Michael Nesmith — electric guitar
 Peter Tork — piano
Additional personnel
 Chip Douglas — bass, percussion, producer
 Bill Martin — bell
 Eddie Hoh — drums
 Nathan Kaproff, George Kast, Alex Murray, Erno Neufeld — violin
 Pete Candoli, Al Porcino, Manuel Stevens — trumpet
 Manuel Stevens — piccolo trumpet
 Richard Noel — trombone
 Richard Leith, Philip Teele — bass trombone
 Shorty Rogers — arrangement

Charts

Weekly charts

Year-end charts

All-time charts

Certifications and sales

John Stewart version

In 1971, songwriter John Stewart recorded his own version and included it as the ninth track on his fourth studio album, The Lonesome Picker Rides Again. His version was released on Warner Bros. Records and was produced by his brother Michael Stewart.

Anne Murray version

Background
Canadian singer Anne Murray recorded a cover version of "Daydream Believer" for her platinum-certified 1979 studio album I'll Always Love You. Produced by Jim Ed Norman and issued on Capitol Records the following year, Murray's single became her eighth No. 1 hit on the U.S. Adult Contemporary chart. It reached No. 12 on the Billboard Hot 100 chart and No. 3 on Billboard'''s country chart. For her 2007 album Anne Murray Duets: Friends and Legends,'' Murray rerecorded the song as a duet with Nelly Furtado.

Chart performance

Weekly charts

See also
List of Hot 100 number-one singles of 1967 (U.S.)
List of number-one singles of 1968 (Ireland)
List of number-one adult contemporary singles of 1980 (U.S.)

References

External links
 Official Video

1967 singles
1979 singles
1980 singles
Songs written by John Stewart (musician)
The Monkees songs
Anne Murray songs
Song recordings produced by Jim Ed Norman
Billboard Hot 100 number-one singles
Cashbox number-one singles
Irish Singles Chart number-one singles
Number-one singles in New Zealand
RPM Top Singles number-one singles
Number-one singles in South Africa
Capitol Records singles
1967 songs
Songs about marriage
Works about suburbs
1960s ballads
Pop ballads